Nguyen Hoang Hai may refer to:

Hoang Hai (born 1982), Vietnamese Pop/R&B singer
Nguyen Van Hai (born c. 1950), Vietnamese dissident blogger